Nong Sida railway station is a railway station located in Nong Sida Subdistrict, Nong Saeng District, Saraburi.

Train services 
 Rapid 145/146 Bangkok–Ubon Ratchathani–Bangkok
 Ordinary No. 233/234 Bangkok–Surin–Bangkok
 Commuter No. 339/340 Bangkok–Kaeng Khoi Junction–Bangkok (weekdays only)
 Commuter No. 341/342 Bangkok–Kaeng Khoi Junction–Bangkok (weekdays only)
 Commuter No. 343/344 Bangkok–Kaeng Khoi Junction–Bangkok (weekends only)

References 
 
 

Railway stations in Thailand